Gary King Aronhalt (March 12, 1949 – May 1, 2021) was an American lawyer who served as Virginia Secretary of Public Safety under Governor Jim Gilmore.

References

External links

1949 births
2021 deaths
Harvard University alumni
State cabinet secretaries of Virginia
Virginia lawyers
Washington College of Law alumni
Virginia Republicans